KCHK (1350 AM) is a radio station broadcasting a mixed format, including classic country music, but is best known for its polka programming. Licensed to New Prague, Minnesota, United States, the station is currently owned by Ingstad Brothers Broadcasting, LLC, and features programming from ABC Radio .

The station is known for playing polka music for the Czechs (hence, the station's call letters KCHK) that settled the area starting in the mid-1850s.

References

External links

Radio stations in Minnesota
Classic country radio stations in the United States
Radio stations established in 1993
1993 establishments in Minnesota